Shibushi may refer to:

Shibushi, Kagoshima, a city in Kagoshima, Japan
Shibushi, another name for the Bushi language